Volt Albania (usually simply called Volt) is a social-liberal political movement in Albania. It is the Albanian branch of Volt Europa, a political movement that operates on a European level.

History
Although Albania is not an EU member state yet, Volt has been actively campaigning in Albania since 2021. In addition to local involvement, members participate in Volt's European level events.

References

Pro-European political parties in Albania
Social liberal parties
Albania
Political parties in Albania